The Swat River is a perennial river in the northern region of Khyber-Pakhtunkhwa Province, Pakistan. The river's source is in the high glacial valleys of the Hindu Kush mountains, where it then flows into the scenic Kalam Valley before forming the spine of the wider Swat valley – an important tourist destination in northern Pakistan for its scenic beauty, and former stronghold of the ancient Gandhara region with numerous ancient Buddhist sites scattered through the region.

Name
The Sanskrit name may mean "clear blue water." Another theory derives the word Swat from the Sanskrit word shveta, also used to describe the clear water of the Swat River. To the ancient Greeks, the river was known as the Soastus. The Chinese pilgrim Faxian referred to Swat as the Su-ho-to.

Course
The Swat's source lies in the Hindu Kush Mountains, from where it is fed by the glacial waters throughout the year. From the high valleys of Swat Kohistan, the river begins at the confluence of the Usho, and Gabral rivers (also known as the Utrar River) at Kalam. From the confluence, the Swat river flows through the narrow gorges of the Kalam Valley until the city of Madyan. From there, the river courses gently for 160 km through the plain areas of the lower Swat Valley until Chakdara. In the extreme southern end of the Swat valley, the river enters a narrow gorge and joins the Panjkora River, at Qalangi before entering the Peshawar Valley. It finally terminates in Kabul River, near Charsadda.

Discharge 
The average discharge at Munda is 280 cubic metres per second.

Economic impact
Swat River plays an important role in the economy of the valley. Lower reaches of the Swat and Malakand Valley are irrigated by a series of canals regulated by the Amandara Headworks - built by the British in 1903.

Swats Canal flows under the Malakand Pass through Benton Tunnel, completed in 1914. Below Dargai, the Munda Headworks, built by the British in 1921, feed canals that supply numerous smaller canals in the districts of Charsadda, Swabi and Mardan in the Peshawar Valley. The river also recharges water wells and springs through seepage.

Hydropower 
Swat's waters are used for hydropower generation at the Jabban Hydropower Plant (completed in 1938), and Dargai Hydropower Plant (completed in 1952). The Mohmand Dam, at the lower end of the Swat River's course before it enters into the Peshawar valley, has an installed generation capacity of 740 MW and is under construction.  Proposed hydropower projects along the river's course are Asrit Kedam HPP, Gabral HPP and Matiltan HPP.

Gallery

See also
 Rigvedic rivers
 Swat, Pakistan
 Barikot

References
 Book: Hidden Treasures of Swat,

External links
 Swat Valley website

Rivers of Khyber Pakhtunkhwa
Kabul River
Swat District
Rigvedic rivers
Rivers in Buddhism
Rivers of Pakistan